Ahora, Spanish for "now", may refer to:

Ahora (newspaper), a Cuban Spanish-language weekly
Ahora, Turkey, now Yenidoğan, a village in Turkey

Music
"Ahora" (J Balvin song), 2018
Ahora (Chiquis Rivera album) or the title song, 2015
Ahora (Christian Nodal album) or the title song, 2019
Ahora (Fiskales Ad-Hok album), 2000
Ahora, an album by Fabiana Cantilo, 2011
Ahora, an album by Melendi, 2018
Ahora, an album by Pedro Aznar, 2012
Ahora, an album by Reik, 2019
Ahora, an album by Rosa López, 2003

See also
Ahora Es (disambiguation)